This is a list of Resident Evil characters, which includes playable and recurring characters that were introduced in Resident Evil, a series of survival horror video games.

Appearances

 P - Playable character (campaign/unlockable-mini campaign) 
P* - Playable character (minigame/DLC)

Protagonists

Chris Redfield

Chris is first introduced in Resident Evil as a pointman for the Raccoon City Police Department's S.T.A.R.S. Alpha Team. In the fight against B.O.W Chris becomes a co-founder of the B.S.A.A, a counter terrorism organization dedicated to fighting the threat of Bio-Organic Weapons (B.O.W) unleashed by criminal or terrorist elements on a global scale.

Jill Valentine

Jill is first introduced in Resident Evil as a member of the Raccoon Police departments's S.T.A.R.S. Alpha Team, Jill is a co-founder of the B.S.A.A, a counter terrorism organization dedicated to fighting the threat of Bio-Organic Weapons (B.O.W) unleashed by criminal or terrorist elements on a global scale.

Albert Wesker 

Albert Wesker is introduced in Resident Evil as a triple agent who poses as the leader of S.T.A.R.S. team, and in subsequent sequels as a high-ranking Umbrella scientist who undermines the pharmaceutical organization on behalf of a rival company with the goal of global saturation.

Rebecca Chambers

Introduced in Resident Evil as a supporting character who serves as the field medic of the S.T.A.R.S team, Rebecca Chambers appears as the co-protagonist of Resident Evil Zero along with Billy Coen.

Leon Scott Kennedy

Leon is first introduced in Resident Evil 2 as a rookie police officer in the Raccoon City Police Department (R.P.D) who escapes from Raccoon City following a zombie outbreak. He is revealed in Resident Evil 4 to have been recruited by the US federal government and trained to become an elite agent who reports directly to the President of the United States.

Claire Redfield

Claire is first introduced in Resident Evil 2 as college student looking for her older brother Chris Redfield. She is depicted in subsequent sequels as a worker for a human rights organization called TerraSave, which provides relief and aid to victims of bioterrorism.

Ada Wong

Introduced in Resident Evil 2, Ada Wong is a field agent working for a mysterious organization known only as the "Agency". Ada is occasionally featured as the main character of select scenarios or campaigns in the franchise's video games.

Billy Coen
 Voiced by (English): James Kee (RE0), Steve Van Wormer (The Umbrella Chronicles)
 Voiced by (Japanese): Katsuyuki Konishi (RE0 HD Remaster)

 is the co-protagonist of Resident Evil Zero along with Rebecca Chambers. He is first mentioned in a police report filed by Chambers that can be found in the Nintendo 64 version of Resident Evil 2, foreshadowing the events of the prequel. A former Second Lieutenant in the United States Marine Corps Force Reconnaissance, Billy is sentenced to death by a military court for massacring 23 people in murky circumstances during a mission in Africa. Billy's flashbacks imply he is innocent and the victim of a cover-up. He escapes en route to his execution and seeks refuge in the Ecliptic Express, a stranded train, where he meets Rebecca Chambers. The two form an alliance in order to survive, using their talents to discover the Umbrella Corporation's secrets. Both characters are monitored by the Queen Leech-James Marcus hybrid, who sends various creatures to subdue them. After revealing the details of his demise, the hybrid Marcus fully mutates into the Queen Leech. In the final battle sequence, Billy and Rebecca destroy the Queen Leech by exploiting its vulnerability to sunlight. Rebecca allows Billy to escape, believing his claims that he is innocent and telling the authorities that he subsequently perished in the Arklay Mountains after their encounter. Billy also appears in  The Umbrella Chronicles.

Jake Muller
 Voiced by (English): Troy Baker (RE6)
 Voiced by (Japanese): Daisuke Namikawa (RE6)
 Motion capture: Troy Baker, Daniel Southworth (stunt double)

Jake Muller appears as one of three main protagonists in Resident Evil 6. He is the illegitimate son of the Albert Wesker; it is believed that Wesker was not aware of his son's existence, as Jake's mother left shortly after being impregnated by him. Jake later works as a freelance mercenary in order to support his mother, whom dies of an unknown chronic disease shortly after Jake receives money for her treatment. Jake was caught up in an act of bioterrorism while operating in anti-government operations in the fictional  Eastern European republic of Edonia. His mercenary comrades are infected with the C-virus, but Jake's specialized blood resists the infection. Soon after, he meets US government agent Sherry Birkin – whose father, William Birkin, was coincidentally Albert's research partner. Sherry and Jake take part in the subsequent battle between the Bioterrorism Security Assessment Alliance and the mutated mercenaries. With his blood resistant to the downside-effects of mutagenic viruses like his father, Jake also inherited several of his father's signature abilities such as increased strength, speed, healing, and advanced combat skills. He demands a large sum of money from the BSAA, in order to sample a pint of his blood to be synthesized for vaccination to combat the C-virus. He and Sherry are captured by Carla Radames, a doppelgänger of Ada Wong, and held captive in Lanshiang, China. They escape during the C-virus outbreak in the city six months later. Over the course of the story of RE6, Jake comes to terms with both the knowledge of his father's actions and of his death at the hands of Chris Redfield three years earlier. After the ordeal, Jake starts a new life fighting BOWs in an underdeveloped country with his real identity covered up by the BSAA.

Ethan Winters

The main character of Resident Evil 7: Biohazard and Resident Evil Village, Ethan is introduced as a civilian who travels to the Bakers' dilapidated family estate in Dulvey, Louisiana in search of his missing wife Mia, and is later relocated to an undisclosed location in Eastern Europe following the events of Resident Evil 7.

Rose Winters
Voiced by (English): Jeannie Tirado (Teenager)
Voiced by (Japanese): Yurianne Eve (Teenager)

Rosemary "Rose" Winters is the daughter of Ethan Winters and his wife Mia. In Resident Evil Village, she is kidnapped by Mother Miranda, who intends to use her latent powers inherited from her parents to resurrect her own daughter, Eva. After Chris Redfield rescued the real Mia, whom Miranda kidnapped and impersonated, Rosemary is revealed to be a half-Mold through her father's exact nature as a sentient Mold. With the help of Chris, Ethan rescues Rosemary from Miranda but at the cost of his own life.

Rose also serves as the playable character in Villages DLC chapter Shadows of Roses, set sixteen years after the events of the game. Files reveal that Rose grew up an outcast due to her nature and abilities that manifested throughout her childhood. Rose has also grown distant from her mother and trained by Chris, even being scouted for Hound Wolf Squad. After learning that she can remove her powers, she enters the realm of the Megamycete to recover a crystal capable of doing so. Navigating the realm, she faces both its twisted creations and remnants of those connected to the Megamycete, such as Eveline and a replica of the Duke. Rose also receives assistance from an entity calling himself Michael, though she eventually learns it to be the remnant of her father Ethan. After acquiring the crystal, Rose learns that it was actually a trap set by the remnant of Miranda, who lured her into the realm in another attempt to resurrect Eva through her. With help from Ethan, Rose is able to regain her powers and kills Miranda for good. Having been able to meet her father, Rose leaves the realm content with her nature. In the epilogue of both the game and DLC chapter, it is revealed Rose has joined Hound Wolf Squad and uses her abilities to fight BOWs.

Main organizations and members
Umbrella Corporation

The Umbrella Corporation is a British-based international pharmaceutical company in the Resident Evil universe. Founded in 1968 by prominent British royal descendants Oswell E. Spencer and Edward Ashford, along with Dr. James Marcus, it is portrayed in the series as a major international player in pharmaceutical goods and medical supplies, along with more clandestine operations utilizing genetic engineering. Their legitimate status is only a front for their secret research of "bio-organic weapons" (B.O.W.s), developed through the use of a unique mutagenic virus discovered by the company founders known as the Progenitor Virus. The company is also presented as having a more public face, producing cosmetics, consumer products, and foods. Umbrella established multiple secret research facilities to help develop various bio-weapons. Its most prominent research facility is located in the Arklay Mountains, just outside Raccoon City, which was able to develop the "T-virus", a powerful mutagen that could dramatically alter living and recently dead organisms. The virus leaked and contaminated most of the Arklay Facility and its surrounding area, setting the stage for the first Resident Evil game. Following the destruction of Raccoon City, all of Umbrella's assets were frozen by the U.S. Government with its trading rights revoked, effectively terminating its operations. However, it did not stop the rise of several bioterrorist organizations around the world, some of them making use of its research, leading to the foundation of BSAA. In Resident Evil 7: Biohazard reveals that Umbrella's American branch was revitalized as the nick-named “Blue Umbrella”, serving as a support company for legal anti-B.O.W. organizations. Resident Evil Village reveals Umbrella's origins are indirectly connected to Mother Miranda.

Oswell E. Spencer
 Voiced by: Adam D. Clark (RE5), Time Winters (REmake 3)
 Voiced by (Japanese): Issei Futamata (REmake 3) 
 Motion capture: Adam D. Clark (RE5)

 is the owner and co-founder of the Umbrella Corporation, a pharmaceutical drug company that secretly manufactures bio-organic weapons. Spencer's backstory is largely told through in-game files. Born into one of the most powerful families of Europe, Spencer was given a prestigious childhood education, parts of the curriculum consisting of virology and eugenic studies. His favorite piece of literature was that of controversial explorer Henry Travis, who had documented a grove of rare culturally-sacred flowers in West Africa. As Spencer entered university, he formed a close friendship with James Marcus and Edward Ashford. Spencer would be forever changed during a hiking trip in the mountains of East Europe, where he became lost and then rescued by a mysterious woman known as Mother Miranda. A de facto biologist, Miranda was also a priestess who had cultivated a religion around a local super-colony of fungus that exhibited preternatural qualities. Under her wing as a research assistant, Spencer became inflamed by the idea of exploiting the biological secrets of the universe to improve and advance humankind. His views conflicted with Miranda, Spencer departed from his mentor, though he continued to correspond with her and would later dedicate his company's four-red logo to the Four Houses of Miranda's region. Inspired by the writings of Henry Travis, Spencer has his associate Dr. James Marcus make an expedition to West Africa, where the latter discovers the aforementioned flowers. Killing most people when ingested, the flower elicited superhuman abilities within a rare number of people who could survive its fatal effects—all thanks to a particular virus within the flower, a virus later dubbed by Spencer and his associates as the Progenitor virus.  With the knowledge he acquired, Spencer developed a god complex while plotting to forcibly evolve humanity into a new superior race through genetic engineering and virology. With limited funding to exploit the flower and its virus, Spencer designs a seemingly benevolent front organization known as Umbrella Pharmaceuticals to accrue revenue so that his machinations on the virus may continue. His colleagues, James Marcus and Edward Ashford, join his company. Through a series of betrayals and espionage, Spencer quickly gains control of the company and its research, and sends subordinates to assassinate Marcus and Ashford.Alexander Ashford: "If nothing is done, Umbrella will be taken over by Spencer." Capcom, Resident Evil – Code: Veronica, Capcom, Nintendo GameCube, (in English), December 3, 2003. Spencer conducts some of his company's research in the Arklay Research Facility, located in the Arklay Mountains. He hires George Trevor, a famous architect, to construct a mansion to conceal the facility, however, with Trevor knowing the secret to the mansion he had just built, Spencer has the architect targeted for assassination and proceeds to abduct Trevor's wife and daughter, having them become test subjects for virus research and development. Trevor's daughter Lisa would become a promising specimen for new fields of bio-exploitation, experiencing much torment and mutilations in the process. Spencer's plans progress smoothly until Marcus returns from the dead through the Queen Leech as absorbing his genetic memory, motivated by revenge to destroy one of Spencer's luxury trains and cause a viral outbreak in the Arklay Research Facility. The outbreak spreads throughout the region, sparking the events of Resident Evil Zero and the original Resident Evil. The virus subsequently spreads to Raccoon City during the events of Resident Evil 2 and Resident Evil 3: Nemesis, prompting the U.S. government to attempt to contain the outbreak by ordering the destruction of the city.

After the city's destruction, Spencer attempts to disguise the incident as a government conspiracy by hiring top lawyers and false witnesses. His actions prolong the legal proceedings and allow the Umbrella Corporation to stay afloat for five more years. Ultimately, Albert Wesker betrays Spencer by handing over secret documents to the U.S. government while providing personal testimony in court. Umbrella's business license is summarily suspended when most of its remains dismantled by the U.S. government. Spencer becomes a wanted man and goes into hiding at his mansion in Europe. Wesker kills Spencer before Chris Redfield and Jill Valentine can arrest him. His first name is written as Oswell in the original version, but misspelled as "Ozwell" in the English version.

Ashford family
In addition to Spencer, the Ashford family are responsible for the founding of Umbrella. The family are involved in various sections of the company though are exiled fifteen years before the events of the series. Twins Alfred and Alexia serve as the main antagonists in Resident Evil – Code: Veronica, while Alexander appears as a boss.

Alexia Ashford
 Voiced by: Leila Johnson (Code: Veronica), Karen Strassman (The Darkside Chronicles)
Played by: Heloise Catherine (Welcome to Raccoon City)

 is the primary antagonist of Resident Evil – Code: Veronica. Along with her twin brother Alfred, she is the product of a cloning experiment by her father to recreate the legendary ancestor Veronica Ashford. Alexia inherits her legendary intelligence and beauty, though became obsessed with becoming an unstoppable world dictator. After developing the T-Veronica virus, Alexia infected herself with the T-Veronica Virus and goes into cryostasis for several years, allowing her to gain control of the virus and retain her personality. She is awoken by a dying Alfred during the events of Code: Veronica. In revenge for this, she sends one of her tentacle monsters to capture Claire and Steve, experimenting on the latter and turning him into a large monster. She is confronted by Albert Wesker towards the end of the game and mutates into her first form, driving him off but is then defeated by Claire's brother Chris. Alexia revives and appears at the very end of the game as the final boss, mutating into another two forms before Redfield kills her for good with the Linear Launcher. Alexia also appears in The Darkside Chronicles as part of a reimagined scenario for Code: Veronica.

In the reboot film Resident Evil: Welcome to Raccoon City (2021), a young Alexia is played by Heloise Catherine.

Alfred Ashford
 Voiced by: Peter Oldring (Code: Veronica), Richard Cansino (The Darkside Chronicles)
Played by: Sophia Ann Pead Gavin (Welcome to Raccoon City)

Alfred Ashford is the secondary antagonist of Resident Evil – Code: Veronica. Created as an experiment by his legal father, Alfred is brought up idolizing his sister, who had inherited many of the ancestor's positive traits. After discovering their origins, Alfred infects Alexander with the T-Veronica virus and is left the patriarch of the Ashford family whilst Alexia goes into cryostasis. He uses his connections with Umbrella to take control of Rockford Island, transforming it into a prison facility and training camp. Unknown to all, Alfred develops split personality based on Alexia, go as far as acting and dressing like his sister. Alfred serves as Claire and Steve's main adversary throughout Code: Veronica, following them throughout the Rockford Island facility and setting up traps for them. Eventually mortally injured during a confrontation at the Antarctic facility, Alfred restores Alexia before dying in her arms. His body is later discovered stuffed into Alexia's cryogenic tube by Chris, who obtains his family jewel to unlock part of the facility. Alfred also appears in Code: Veronicas retelling in The Darkside Chronicles, though he is killed by Alexia for "waking her too late" rather than succumbing to his injuries.

In the reboot film Resident Evil: Welcome to Raccoon City (2021), a young Alfred is played by Sophia Ann Pead Gavin.

Alexander Ashford
 Voiced by: Troy Baker (The Darkside Chronicles)

Alexander Ashford is the late-patriarch of the Ashford family. The son of the late-Edward Ashford, Alexander set out to restore their family's legacy by creating twins Alfred and Alexia Ashford from genetic material of his legendary ancestor Veronica. He also develops the Linear Launcher to deal with Alexia after growing concerned of her growing superiority complex. After the twins learn of their true origins, they infect Alexander with the T-Veronica virus, transforming him into a creature referred to as Nosferatu. The twins then imprison him deep within the Artic facility, where he remains for the following years. Alexander breaks free during the events of Code: Veronica, where he confronts Claire and Steve as they attempt to flee the facility. Alexander is finally killed when Redfield destroys his heart. His body is later recovered by her brother Chris to obtain his pendant to access the depths of the facility. Alexander retains the Nosferatu role in game's retelling in The Darkside Chronicles. However, his pre-Nosferatu form appears in a message recording as part of the Arctic facility's self-destruct sequence.

UBCS
One of Umbrella's subsidiaries is UBCS (Umbrella Biohazard Countermeasure Service), a private military company with a highly trained security force composed of mostly war criminals and exiled soldiers and capable of rescue and reconnaissance paramilitary operations. The corporation also uses its top-secret special forces group to secure and protect its assets and high-profile employees.

Carlos Oliveira
 Voiced by (English): Vince Corazza (RE3), Scott McNeil (Under the Skin), Gideon Emery (Operation Raccoon City), Jeff Schine (REmake 3) Drake Mefestta (Dead by Daylight)
 Voiced by (Japanese): Shoto Kashii (Under the Skin), Masaki Terasoma (Apocalypse, Extinction, Retribution) Masashi Ebara (Extinction, Retribution, TV dub) Hiroki Yasumoto (Operation Raccoon City, REmake 3)
 Motion capture performance by: Jeff Schine (REmake 3)
 Played by: Oded Fehr (Apocalypse, Extinction, Retribution)

, the second main character of Resident Evil 3, is a mercenary and a former member of a South American communist guerrilla group. After the government forces wiped out his organization, Carlos was scouted out by the Umbrella Corporation to join Umbrella's UBCS. He joined the force and was assigned to Delta Platoon, Company A (serving alongside Nicholai Ginovaef and Mikhail Victor), which was in charge of heavy firearms and weapons maintenance. Despite his violent background, he is warm-hearted and known for joking around. In Resident Evil 3: Nemesis, Carlos assists Jill Valentine throughout the game as the two of them attempt to escape Raccoon City. After she becomes infected by the T-virus after a battle with the Nemesis, he recovers a vaccine to treat her and successfully escapes the city with Jill. In the remake, Carlos' role as a playable character is expanded upon, including a brief excursion to the Raccoon City Police Department. He also appears as a playable character in The Umbrella Chronicles, where the events of Resident Evil 3 are revisited in the "Raccoon's Destruction" scenario.

In the Resident Evil movie franchise, Carlos' surname is spelled "Olivera". His character plays a similar role to his video game counterpart as a disgruntled Umbrella mercenary. In Resident Evil: Apocalypse, he is briefly infected with the T-virus, but Alice finds a sample of the antivirus in time to cure him. In the third film, he and Alice parted company five years ago when Alice sought to protect her allies from the Umbrella satellites tracking her, but they meet again when he is travelling with a convoy led by Claire Redfield. When Carlos is bitten during an attempt to capture Alice, he volunteers to mount a suicide run on the Umbrella complex tracking Alice after it takes a series of prisoners from the convoy, reasoning that there is no time to get a sample of the antivirus before the infection becomes permanent, taking a fuel tanker into the mass of zombies surrounding the base and then setting off a series of bombs, taking out a sizeable number of zombies and breaching the complex defenses.

Mikhail Victor
 Voiced by (English): Benedict Campbell (RE3), William Hope (REmake 3)
 Voiced by (Japanese): Naoki Tamanoi (REmake 3)
 Motion capture performance by: William Hope (REmake 3)

 is the leader of the UBCS Delta platoon that both Nicholai and Carlos are members of. According to his backstory, Mikhail is from Saint Petersburg, Russia, and had originally served in the army before joining a rebel group. Mikhail was eventually arrested by Russian government forces and convicted for acts of terrorism. He was then coerced into leading the UBCS in exchange for his men's freedom. In the game, he appears already wounded, choosing to sacrifice his own life to save Jill and Carlos as he dies after being blown apart by his own grenade in a failed attempt to destroy the Nemesis. In an early draft of the story, Mikhail was originally scripted to be Nicholai's older brother, hence their common nationality and close ages (his original name was Mikhail Ginovaef). Mikhail also appears in the game's remake, maintaining the same role as the original game, in addition of knowing Jill's identity as a member of a defunct S.T.A.R.S. team, and suspicious about Nicholai's true motive. He is the only one of the main UBCS operatives not to appear in the film Resident Evil: Apocalypse, where he is replaced by an original character named Yuri Loginova.

Nicholai Ginovaef
 Voiced by (English): Roger Honeywell (RE3), Rick D. Wasserman (Operation Raccoon City), Neil Newbon (REmake 3, Resistance)
 Voiced by (Japanese): Rikiya Koyama (Apocalypse, TV dub) Kenta Miyake (Operation Raccoon City, REmake 3)
 Motion-capture performance by: Neil Newbon (REmake 3)
 Played by: Zack Ward (Apocalypse)

 is a member of the UBCS Delta platoon, Company B. According to his backstory, Nicholai is from Moscow and served in the Russian Spetsnaz before joining the UBCS. He also has an unspoken rivalry with HUNK. In Resident Evil 3: Nemesis, Nikolai is one of the few surviving operatives from the Delta platoon, along with Carlos and Mikhail. He disappears after an event in the first half of the game and is presumed dead until another encounter with him. It is revealed that Nikolai is in fact one of the Supervisors UBCS operatives, assigned to watch and gather combat data as their comrades fight against Umbrella's bio-weapons. Nicholai's fate depends on decisions made by the player, resulting in either his escape or death, either at the hand of Jill or the Nemesis. In the Resident Evil 3 remake, Nicholai is changed to a mole implanted within the UBCS for an unnamed organization. Hired to mitigate the company's efforts to contain the T-virus outbreak, he murders research staff and tries to gain and destroy a virus vaccine. In the final confrontation with Jill and Carlos, he is injured and left behind in Raccoon City. The English localization of Resident Evil Survivor features a document supposedly authored by Nicholai after the events of Nemesis. The file is different in the original Japanese version and the Chinese localization of the PC port. The third entry of the document (the portion dated after the events of Nemesis) was actually authored by the "Umbrella B.O.W. Development Staff", rather than Nikolai. Nicholai also appears in Resident Evil Outbreak in the final scenario "Decisions, Decisions", which depicts the character conducting another mission occurring during the same time period as the second half of Resident Evil 3. He is mentioned in The Umbrella Chronicles, where he is referred to by the codename "Silver Fox". Nicholai's role in Resident Evil: Operation Raccoon City was stopping Wolfpack from completing their mission objective.

The character was adapted for the film Resident Evil: Apocalypse, although the film features a more heroic depiction of Nicholai, which differs from the game's original antagonistic portrayal of the character. In the film's novelization, he was renamed Nicholai Sokolov. Nicholai is ultimately torn to shreds by zombie dogs while holding them off so Alice and Jill can escape.

Sergei Vladimir
 Voiced by: Patrick Seitz (The Umbrella Chronicles)

 is a high-ranking Russian employee of Umbrella and the main antagonist of Resident Evil: The Umbrella Chronicles. Following the fall of the Soviet Union, he approached the Umbrella Corporation and quickly became one of the company's top officers. He became personally acquainted with Umbrella's founder, Ozwell E. Spencer, who began to rely on Sergei as a loyal and effective enforcer. Sergei subsequently formed and led Umbrella's UBCS, as well as Umbrella's internal espionage organization, Monitor. Agents that answered directly to Sergei included the likes of Nicholai Ginovaef. Sergei undertakes the Umbrella Corporation's most important tasks through the Resident Evil series, including stealing the Red Queen from the Arklay Research Facility, extracting an Umbrella executive from Raccoon City before its destruction, and securing important research information. Sergei is killed by Albert Wesker while attempting to prevent him from stealing a database containing the Umbrella Corporation's most important documents and research data.

Tyrell Patrick
 Voiced by (English): Peter Windrem (RE3), Sterling Sulieman (REmake 3)
 Voiced by (Japanese): Daichi Endō (REmake 3)
 Motion capture performance by: Sterling Sulieman (REmake 3)

 is a member of the UBCS. A former member of the French Foreign Legion, he was arrested for illegal arms dealing. Whilst serving a life sentence, he was approached by Umbrella to join their UBCS. In Resident Evil 3: Nemesis, Tyrell is the Supervisor of Bravo platoon, tasked with gathering data on their Bio-Organic Weapons performance against UBCS soldiers. Whilst searching the Raccoon City Hospital for its T-virus vaccine, Tyrell is ambushed by Nicholai Ginovaef. Depending on a decision made by Carlos, he either is caught in a boobytrap set up by Nicholai or attempts to kill him in a suicidal attack. In the remake, Tyrell is instead a member of Delta platoon and not affiliated with the Supervisors. He and Carlos are tasked with finding Umbrella scientist Nathanial Bard and recovering his T-virus vaccine. After gaining access to the NEST 2 research facility with Jill, he is killed by the Nemesis.

USS
The Umbrella Security Service were first introduced in Resident Evil 2. USS Alpha team attempted to steal a sample of the G-virus, causing the citywide outbreak in the game. Delta team appeared in the prequel Resident Evil Zero, in which the team was sent in to blow up the Ecliptic Express after the trouble occurred, but was overwhelmed by the leeches and wiped out. Delta team was under the direct command of Wesker and Birkin. According to Code: Veronica, USFU agents were trained at the Rockfort Island facility.

Ghost
"Ghost" is an Umbrella Secret Service (USS) soldier that was made playable in Resident Evil 2 (2019 version) in a mode called The Ghost Survivors. Little is known about him as a person, but he does not survive long enough to get out of Raccoon City. He has to contend with zombies covered in armour. His story is told in a chapter, referred to as "Forgotten Soldier".

HUNK
 Voiced by (English): Keith Silverstein (The Umbrella Chronicles, The Darkside Chronicles, Operation Raccoon City, Revelations, REmake 2)
 Voiced by (Japanese): Masaki Terasoma (Operation Raccoon City, Revelations, REmake 2)

 is an enigmatic special forces agent of the Umbrella Security Service unit in Resident Evil 2. His notoriety for being the sole survivor of multiple operations earned him the moniker 'Grim Reaper'. HUNK initially appears in Resident Evil 2, where he is playable in a secret minigame titled "4th Survivor". This short scenario entails HUNK's journey to escape Raccoon City, beginning with his awakening in the sewers and eventually leading to his extraction from the city. He is the only member of his unit to survive the attack of the mutated William Birkin that takes place shortly after he secured a sample of the G-virus for Umbrella. He reappears in The Umbrella Chronicles, in a remake of the "4th Survivor" scenario where the player must reach the helipad for extraction from Raccoon City, and during the "Memories of a Lost City" scenario in Resident Evil: The Darkside Chronicles. HUNK is playable in the "Mercenaries" minigame in Resident Evil 4, but has no relation to the story. HUNK appears as a side character in Resident Evil: Operation Raccoon City, where he works with other Umbrella Security Service operatives to recover a sample of the G-virus prior to the events of Resident Evil 2. He is also a playable character in Resident Evil: The Mercenaries 3D, Resident Evil: Revelations, and Resident Evil: Revelations 2.

Umbrella Corps
The Umbrella Corps, also known as Blue Umbrella, are a newly formed mercenary group working for the newly reformed Umbrella Corporation. They play a vital role in Resident Evil 7: Biohazard.

Veronica
 Voiced by: Caroline Bloom
Veronica is a member of the Umbrella Corps. She appears behind-the-scenes in Resident Evil 7: Biohazards downloadable chapter Not a Hero, providing intel to Chris Redfield about Lucas Baker and the Connections. Her role is similar to Ingrid Hunnigan from Resident Evil 4.

3A7
 Voiced by: D. C. Douglas
"3A7" (3A-7 in localized versions) is the player character in the single player challenges of Umbrella Corps. An unnamed agent within the organization, he is set to various tests of the company's new BOWs and equipment. Against all odds, 3A7 survives the experiments, including those rigged by their superiors against him. After the final set within an Artic Base, he is dubbed "the New Grim Reaper", though his fate afterwards is unknown. Missions briefings and in-game files hint or speculate that the agent may actually be HUNK.

Notable researchers
Alex Wesker
 Voiced by (English): Mary Elizabeth McGlynn (Revelations 2, REmake 3)
 Voiced by (Japanese): Rica Fukami (Revelations 2, REmake 3)
 Motion capture: Elaine Hendrix (Revelations 2)
 Face Model: Elaine Hendrix (Revelations 2)

The main antagonist of Resident Evil: Revelations 2, an Umbrella researcher who quotes Franz Kafka and developed the T-Phobos virus, which causes those infected to mutate when overcome with fear. Alex is the only other surviving participant of the Wesker project besides her “brother” Albert Wesker despite lacking Albert's heightened abilities. Alex uses her position in Umbrella to establish a facility on the impoverished Sejm Island, kickstarting an economic recovery while exploiting the residents to be her test subjects for T-Phobos Project that Spencer assigned her as a means for him to cheat death. But Alex is spurred by her failing health to instead develop a method to transplant a digital copy of her mind into a host body able to resist fear. Hastening her work after learning of Spencer and Albert's deaths, Alex exploits Neil Fisher with the Uroboros virus she was refining to provide her with candidates from TerraSave, with only Claire Redfield and Moira Burton the sole survivors of her experiments.

Alex also captures Natalia Korda as her ideal host, disposing of Fisher before proceeding with her experiment before committing suicide with the expectation to awaken as Natalia within six months. But she is instead mutated by the T-Phobos at the last second from fearing her own demise, suffering an existential crisis with the maddened resolve to kill Natalia before her copy could manifest by releasing the Uroboros virus on the island as Barry arrived. After infecting herself with the Uroboros, Alex is killed during the BSAA's assault on the island. Regardless of Alex's death, her copy starts manifesting as depicted in the bonus episode "Little Miss" and the game's epilogue.

Annette Birkin
 Voiced by (English): Jennifer Dale (RE2), Deborah Sale Butler (DC), Karen Strassman (REmake 2, REmake 3)
 Voiced by (Japanese): Marika Hayashi (REmake 2, REmake 3)
 Motion capture: Karen Strassman (REmake 2)
Played by: Janet Porter (Welcome to Raccoon City)

 is a supporting character in Resident Evil 2. She is involved in Bio Organic Weapon research at Umbrella, working with her husband William to create the G-virus. During the Raccoon City outbreak, Annette works to stop Umbrella's experiments from spreading further into the city. She leaves their daughter Sherry at the Raccoon Police Department with a pendant containing the virus, hoping Irons can protect her. During the game's events, Annette helps Claire cure Sherry's G-virus infection and reveals Ada's true motives to Leon. She is fatally injured, forcing them to leave her behind. Annette appears in the game's remake, maintaining the same role as in the original game, and its retelling in The Darkside Chronicles.

In the reboot film Resident Evil: Welcome to Raccoon City (2021), Annette is played by Janet Porter.

James Marcus
 Voiced by (English): Ian Downie (RE0)
 Voiced by (Japanese): Hiroshi Ito (RE0)
 Played by: Mark Simpson (The Final Chapter)

 is the main antagonist of Resident Evil Zero. Years before the events of the first Resident Evil, he was one of the top virologist researchers of the Umbrella Corporation and a head of its personnel training facility, personally appointed by Oswell E. Spencer to work with the Progenitor virus. In this capacity, Marcus played an integral role in developing the T-virus (Tyrant virus), and the Tyrant and Nemesis programs, also conducting extensive research on leeches that led to the development of the G-virus, up until his death in 1988. Spencer betrayed him by sending Marcus' direct subordinates, Albert Wesker and William Birkin, to murder him and steal his research. They dumped his body away along with the Queen Leech that Marcus created, the creature consuming his body and ended up absorbing his genetic memory as consequence. This resulted in the Queen Leech believing itself to be Marcus reborn. Serving as the antagonist of Resident Evil Zero, The Queen Leech avenges the real Marcus by triggering the events of the first Resident Evil game by causing a T-virus outbreak in the Arklay Mansion before being destroyed by Rebecca Chambers and Billy Coen. Marcus also appears in The Umbrella Chronicles.

In the film Resident Evil: The Final Chapter (2016), James is played by Mark Simpson. In the film, it is revealed that Alice is a clone of James's daughter, Alicia Marcus. In the Netflix's live-action series (2022), set in its own universe but featuring the game series storyline as its backstory, James Marcus has a daughter named Evelyn, played by Paola Núñez, who inherited control of Umbrella.

William Birkin
 Voiced by (English): Diego Matamoros (RE2), T.J. Rotolo (The Umbrella Chronicles, The Darkside Chronicles, Operation Raccoon City, REmake 2), Misha Standjofski (Dead by Daylight)
 Voiced by (Japanese): Toshihiko Seki (Operation Raccoon City, 0, REmake 2)
 Motion capture: T.J. Rotolo (REmake 2)
 Played by: Jason Isaacs (RE), Neal McDonough (Welcome to Raccoon City)

 is one of the main antagonists in the Resident Evil series, specifically Resident Evil 2. After completing his G-virus project (Golgotha virus), he is mortally wounded by agents of the Umbrella Special Forces and his work is stolen. Left for dead, he injects himself with the G-virus, thus turning himself into a monster known as "G". He then kills his attackers, causing a T-virus vial to be leaked into the city's drainage system, resulting in the zombie outbreak in Raccoon City. During the course of the game, he encounters the main characters, Claire Redfield and Leon S. Kennedy, as he undergoes gradual mutation and begins losing any resemblance of his original human form. He is eventually defeated by Claire and Leon, with the help of his daughter Sherry. Birkin is mentioned in Wesker's Report as the scientist who helped Wesker fake his death and is retroactively mentioned in the GameCube remake of the first Resident Evil. He also makes an appearance in Resident Evil Zero, where he assists Wesker from behind the scenes, and also appears in a cutscene in The Umbrella Chronicles along with Albert Wesker.

In the first Resident Evil film, Birkin makes an uncredited cameo appearance portrayed by Jason Isaacs as the head of the Nemesis project, who was also the film's narrator. According to an audio commentary by Paul W. S. Anderson, Isaacs was planned to reprise this role in the sequel Resident Evil: Apocalypse, but left the project for undisclosed reasons, so an original character named Dr. Alexander Isaacs (played by Iain Glen) was created to fulfill Birkin's role in the sequel.

In the reboot film Resident Evil: Welcome to Raccoon City (2021), Birkin is played by Neal McDonough, appearing as the main antagonist of the film.

Fictional organizations

BSAA
The BSAA (Bioterrorism Security Assessment A'''lliance), is a private military company formed between the events of Resident Evil 4 and Resident Evil 5. It was founded by Jill Valentine, Chris Redfield, Clive R. O'Brian, and eight others after the fall of Umbrella, with the aim of combating the increasing numbers of B.O.W.s being sold on the black market. Originally a non-government organization, the BSAA was placed under United Nations Security Council control when the U.S. government funded Federal Bioterrorism Commission (FBC) was revealed to be corrupt.

 Parker Luciani 
 Voiced by: Mitsuru Miyamoto

Parker was originally a member of the FBC tasked with helping out during the 2004 Veltro terrorist attack of Terragrigia. However he and his partner Jessica Sherawat barely managed to make it out alive and fled into the FBC building. During their trip to the Command Room, they met and saved the new cadet, Raymond Vester. He and Parker then bonded. At the command room, they met Morgan Lansdale, who was collaborating with Jack Norman, and in the midst of betraying him. After that, the group escaped the city. In 2005, Parker and Jill followed Chris and Jessica's last known coordinates to a stranded cruise ship named Queen Zenobia in the Mediterranean Sea. They realized that the entire crew of the Queen Zenobia had been turned into monstrous bio organic weapons named Ooze and are forced to fight for their lives. On the ship's bridge, they are surprised to meet none other than Vester who claims to be there by orders of the FBC. After Jessica is revealed to be a traitor, she sets the Queen Zenobia to self-destruct. Parker was later seen dangling above end then falling into a series of explosions after the floor he was standing on collapsed. It is ultimately revealed that Raymond Vester saved Parker from the explosion. Parker was then found adrift off the shore of the Republic of Malta in the Mediterranean Sea. He resumed his position as a Special Operations Agent for the BSAA after a month of recovery.

 Piers Nivans 
 Voiced by (English): Chris Emerson (RE6)
 Voiced by (Japanese): Shuhei Sakaguchi (RE6)
 Face Model: Adam Crosman (RE6)
 Portrayed by: Wataru Kuriyama (stage play)

Piers Nivans is a member of the North American Branch of the BSAA in Resident Evil 6. He is a talented marksman, who served under Chris Redfield during the Edonian Civil War in 2012. On one of their missions, Carla Radames infects their comrades with the C-virus and turns them into mutants. Chris is knocked unconscious in the ensuing battle but is rescued by Piers. Chris becomes disillusioned and disappears after recovering. Piers tracks down Chris and successfully convinces him to rejoin the BSAA to avenge his dead comrades. They are deployed to Lanshiang, China and tasked to stop a bio-terrorism attack. The duo are eventually led to an underwater laboratory that is being used to create powerful bio-organic weapons. Piers is severely injured during their final battle with the B.O.W., Haos, and injects himself with the C-virus to continue fighting. After he and Chris manage to defeat the Haos, they then attempt to escape the laboratory during its self-destruction sequence, but after realizing that he is beginning to succumb to the C-virus, Piers seals Chris inside an escape pod in order to ensure his survival, while he stays behind during the laboratory's destruction to prevent himself from mutating any further, sacrificing himself in the process. Right before his death, Piers manages to save Chris from the still-alive Haos by killing it as it attempts to destroy the escape pod Chris is in. Chris honors Piers's memory by remaining with the BSAA (when before, Chris thought of retiring and leaving Piers in charge). Piers is mentioned by name during the epilogue in Resident Evil: Revelations 2, as he is in China with Chris.

 Sheva Alomar 

 Hound Wolf Squad 
Voiced by (English): Kane Jungbluth-Murry (Elba), Conner Marx (Wilson), Rez Kempton (Graham), Rey Silva (Perlman), Andi Norris (Berkhoff)
Voiced by (Japanese): Haruo Yamagishi (Elba), Kazuhiro Fusegawa (Wilson), Shigeo Kiyama (Graham), Kosuke Sakaki (Perlman), Farahnaz Nikray (Berkhoff)
Hound Wolf Squad are an elite BSAA taskforce under the direct command of Chris Redfield. Formed after the events of Resident Evil 7, they consist of operatives disgruntled by the organization's decision to cover up the Baker incident and primarily operate off the books, though are assisted by the Umbrella Corps. By Villages events, Hound Wolf consists of six members: Chris Redfield (Alpha), Rolando Elba (Umber Eyes), Dion Wilson (Canine), Charlie Graham (Night Howl), John Perlman (Lobo), and Emily Berkhoff (Tundra). During the game, they help Chris infiltrate the Village and investigate Miranda, uncovering her connections to both Oswell E. Spencer and the creation of the bioweapon Eveline. After Miranda's defeat, the squad also learn that the BSAA have also deployed BOWs to deal with Miranda. Hound Wolf are still active by the events of Shadows of Rose, set sixteen years after the events of Village. Rose is both trained by the members and joins the squad after the chapter's events.

United States authorities
STARS
S.T.A.R.S. (Special Tactics And Rescue Service, also known as the Special Tactics And Rescue Squad in early localizations) is a special operations force in the Raccoon Police Department, introduced in the original Resident Evil and disbanded before the events of the sequel. Its key members included Albert Wesker, Barry Burton, Brad Vickers, Chris Redfield, Enrico Marini, Forest Speyer, Jill Valentine, Joseph Frost, Kenneth J. Sullivan, Rebecca Chambers and Richard Aiken.

Barry Burton
 Voiced by (English): Barry Gjerde (RE), Ed Smaron (REmake) Jamieson K. Price (RE5, The Mercenaries 3D) Michael McConnohie (Revelations 2)
 Voiced by (Japanese): Yusaku Yara (Revelations 2, REmake HD Remaster)
 Played by: Gregory Smith (RE live-action cutscenes), Kevin Durand (Retribution)

 is a middle-aged (38-year-old in the original Resident Evil) SWAT-veteran and STARS Alpha Team's weapons specialist. In the original Resident Evil, Barry plays a supporting role in Jill's story while only appearing briefly in the opening scene of Chris' scenario. During the course of the game, it is revealed that he was blackmailed into betraying his teammates by Albert Wesker, who threatened to harm his family if he refused. He returns in Resident Evil 3: Nemesis, where he helps Jill and Carlos escape from Raccoon City before its destruction. However, Barry doesn't appear in the 2020 remake of the same game, Jill and Carlos instead leaving as a pair. Barry also appears in the non-canonical game Resident Evil Gaiden as one of its two player characters, and as a DLC character in the Resident Evil 5 Mercenaries Reunion mode.

After non-canon appearances in games for several years, Barry was a playable character in Resident Evil: Revelations 2. Barry arrived on Sushestvovanie Island to search for his daughter, Moira, and the returning Claire Redfield, who got captured by men sent by Alex Wesker, and used a radio tower to send out a distress call. Barry also meets a little girl named Natalia Korda, who can sense the presence of hidden items, and monsters. Natalia can be controlled by the player as well as Barry, but can only use bricks to attack  monsters. During the events of Resident Evil: Revelations 2, it is revealed Barry was estranged from Moira. Eventually, Barry winds up having to battle Alex Wesker, believing she killed Moira, and she targets Natalia for nefarious reasons. In the end, Barry survives the ordeal, killing Alex with Claire's help, and reconciles with Moira, who showed up belatedly to save her father and friends. Barry then adopts Natalia, with everybody unaware that Alex is now somehow part of her, following her death.

PlayStation Universe described Barry as "something of a legend among RE aficionados, thanks in no small part to his utterly laughable dialogue segments in the original Resident Evil," adding that "he also remains one of the most genuinely likeable characters in the franchise, especially after the chaps at Capcom polished up his hammy ways for the GameCube remake." In 2010, Joystick Division ranked him fifth, on a list of top supporting characters in video game history.

In the film Resident Evil: Retribution (2012), Barry is played by Kevin Durand.

Brad Vickers
 Voiced by (English): Evan Sabba (RE3), Adam Paul (REmake), Darren O'Hare (REmake 3)
 Motion Capture Performance by: Neil Newbon (REmake 3)
 Voiced by (Japanese): Wataru Takagi (REmake 3)
 Played by: Nathan Dales (Welcome to Raccoon City)

 is a STARS helicopter pilot and Alpha team's computer and information expert, nicknamed "Chickenheart". He leaves his teammates stranded in the forest during the opening of the first Resident Evil after panicking, but returns at the end of the game to save the survivors (Jill, Chris, Barry, and Rebecca). In Resident Evil 3, despite trying to avoid any further involvement in the events surrounding Umbrella, Brad is targeted by Nemesis and eventually killed. He can be seen as a zombie in front of the police department in Resident Evil 2 if the player meets certain goals. Brad's fate was altered in the Resident Evil 3 remake where he is infected by a zombie bite and reanimates before being put down by Carlos.

In the reboot film Resident Evil: Welcome to Raccoon City (2021), Brad Vickers is played by Nathan Dales.

Enrico Marini
Voiced by (English): Dean Harrington (RE1), Daniel Hagen (REmake)
Voiced by (Japanese): Masaki Aizawa (REmake)
Played by: Sammy Azero (Welcome to Raccoon City)
 is the leader of STARS Bravo Team. In the original Resident Evil, he is discovered seriously injured in the caves beneath the Spencer Mansion. Enrico informs the player of its connection to Umbrella and warns of a mole in STARS. However, he is executed by Wesker before he can inform them anymore. This role is also maintained in the 2002 remake of the game. Enrico also appears in Resident Evil Zero, which follows Bravo team prior to their discovery of the Spencer Mansion. He makes frequent contact with Rebecca during the events of the game.

In the reboot film Resident Evil: Welcome to Raccoon City, Enrico is played by Sammy Azero.

Richard Aiken
 Voiced by (English): Joe Whyte (REmake)
 Voiced by (Japanese): Yūji Ueda (REmake HD Remaster)
 Played by: Chad Rook (Welcome to Raccoon City)

 is the STARS' radio communications specialist and one of the Bravo Team members involved in the Spencer Mansion Incident. In the original Resident Evil game, he is found on the east wing of the Mansion's second floor, severely wounded and poisoned by a giant snake. After a brief detour to collect antivenom, Richard dies, either after imparting information and a radio (if the player returns quickly), or prior to their return. In the remake version, whilst playing as Jill, Richard will accompany the player into the fight with Yawn, sacrificing himself to push her away from a lethal attack, and being ingested by the snake. Whilst playing as Chris, Richard will be killed during the encounter with the shark-based Neptune monster. In the novel The Umbrella Conspiracy, Richard is found by Chris and Rebecca, already dead from the poison. In Resident Evil: The Umbrella Chronicles, Richard is a companion of Rebecca. He is one of the playable characters in the multiplayer mode of Resident Evil: Deadly Silence.

In the reboot film Resident Evil: Welcome to Raccoon City (2021), Aiken is played by Chad Rook.

Raccoon Police Department
The Raccoon Police Department (R.P.D.) is a law enforcement service in Raccoon City.

Brian Irons
 Voiced by (English): Gary Krawford (RE2), JB Blanc (The Darkside Chronicles), Sid Carton (REmake 2)
 Voiced by (Japanese): Akio Hirose (REmake2)
 Motion capture: Sid Carton (REmake 2)
 Played by: Donal Logue (Welcome to Raccoon City)
Brian Irons is the Police Chief of the RPD. He is secretly bribed by Umbrella to cover up the T-virus outbreak in the Arklay laboratories and their experiments with the G-virus. During the Raccoon City outbreak, Irons goes insane and begins killing people in the department building indiscriminately, including Mayor Warren's daughter Katherine. Irons is encountered several times by Claire Redfield, who gradually learns of his alliance with Birkin and Umbrella. He is eventually killed by a mutated William Birkin. In the game's remake, Irons kidnaps Sherry Birkin and tries to use her pendant to access the NEST facility. It is also revealed that he is also the director of an orphanage used to supply Umbrella with human test subjects, where he holds her until he can retrieve her pendant from Claire. Irons chases Sherry as she attempts to escape, but is eventually attacked and implanted with an G-embryo. He dies when the creature erupts from his body just as Claire arrives to confront him. Irons also appears in The Darkside Chronicles, though his role is greatly downplayed to a brief confrontation with Leon and Claire.

In the reboot film Resident Evil: Welcome to Raccoon City (2021), Irons is played by Donal Logue and is considered more heroic than his game counterpart.

Elliot Edward
 Voiced by (Japanese): Kenji Takahashi (REmake 2)
Elliot Edward is an RPD officer and minor character in Resident Evil 2. He appears in the opening minutes of Scenario B trying to reach an evacuation helicopter. However, he is attacked and killed by zombies, during which he causes the helicopter to crash by accidentally shooting the pilot and blocks off part of the RPD. In the remake, Elliot works with other officers in an attempt to escape the overrun RPD. Eventually discovering a way out, he is ripped apart by creatures as he attempts to get to the player's character, though is able to give them the information about a secret passage. His corpse later transforms into a zombie.

Marvin Branagh
Voiced by (English): Lex Lang (The Darkside Chronicles), Christopher Watson (REmake 2. REmake 3)
Voiced by (Japanese): Fuminori Komatsu (REmake 2)
Motion capture: Christopher Watson (REmake 2)
Marvin Branagh is a lieutenant in the RPD. In the original Resident Evil 2, he is discovered suffering from a serious injury in Scenario A by either Leon or Claire, and informs them of the Mansion Incident. Giving them his keycard to unlock areas of the police station, he forces them to leave him behind and locks the door behind them. Marvin later transforms into a zombie and attacks the player. In the Resident Evil 2 remake, he is more proactive in helping the protagonists escape the RPD and helps them unlock the passage before also becoming a zombie when the player returns to the RPD. Marvin also appears briefly in both versions of Resident Evil 3, the remake showing that he was infected by a zombified Brad Vickers. Marvin also appears in Resident Evil Outbreak: File 2 and The Darkside Chronicles.

DSO
The Division of Security Operations (DSO) is an anti-bioterrorism organization under the jurisdiction of the United States federal government.

Ingrid Hunnigan
 Voiced by (English): Salli Saffioti (RE4, Degeneration, Damnation, RE6)
 Voiced by (Japanese): Yū Sugimoto (Degeneration, Damnation, RE6, REmake 4)
 Motion Capture performance: Jolene Andersen (Damnation)

Ingrid Hunnigan serves as Leon S. Kennedy's Case Officer. As an F.O.S. agent (Field Operations Support) Hunnigan provides Leon with tactical information relevant to his current situation. She assisted him during his missions to rescue Ashley Graham in Resident Evil 4 and to stop Neo-Umbrella in Resident Evil 6. She also makes brief appearances in Resident Evil: Degeneration and Resident Evil: Damnation.

Sherry Birkin
 Voiced by (English): Lisa Yamanaka (RE2), Laura Bailey (The Darkside Chronicles), Eden Riegel (Operation Raccoon City, RE6), Eliza Pryor (REmake 2)
 Voiced by (Japanese): Mayumi Iizuka (Resident Evil 2 drama cd, child), Hisako Kanemoto (Operation Raccoon City, child), Maaya Sakamoto (RE6, adult), Rio Sasaki (REmake 2, child)
 Motion Capture performance: Sara Fletcher (RE6), Eliza Pryor (REmake 2)
 Facial Model: Sara Fletcher (RE6)
Played by: Holly de Barros (Welcome to Raccoon City)

 is the daughter of William and Annette Birkin. She first appears in Resident Evil 2, running away and hiding in Raccoon City during the outbreak. She manages to find Leon and Claire, who protect her while trying to escape the city. Sherry is a playable character in some parts of the game but she is completely unarmed and can only avoid the monsters. In the remake, she is abducted and held hostage by Brian Irons before being rescued by Claire. Her father has been transformed into a monstrous creature by the G-virus and infects her, but Claire gives Sherry an anti-virus, which prevents her from mutating. Sherry assists Leon and Claire in boarding a secret underground train, and successfully escapes Raccoon City before it is destroyed. Sherry also appears in Resident Evil: The Darkside Chronicles in chapters that recapitulate the events of Resident Evil 2. She returns as an adult in Resident Evil 6 as a government agent escorting Jake Muller and seems to have acquired great healing abilities from the remnants of the G-virus in her body. During the course of the game, she helps Jake deal with the fact that Albert Wesker is his father. She also learns from Leon S. Kennedy that her superior, Derek C. Simmons, is the man responsible for the U.S. President's death. She and Jake subsequently ally with Leon, Chris Redfield and their partners in thwarting Carla Radames' plans.

In the reboot film Resident Evil: Welcome to Raccoon City (2021), Sherry is played by Holly de Barros.

Derek C. Simmons
 Voiced by (English): David Lodge (RE6)
 Voiced by (Japanese): Takayuki Sugō (RE6)
Derek Clifford Simmons is the primary antagonist of Leon's campaign in Resident Evil 6. Simmons is the National Security Advisor and a close friend to Adam Benford. He is the leader of a secret organization known as "The Family" whose ancestor founded, using its vast political influence to maintain world order. He hired Ada Wong to acquire the G-Virus while overseeing the missile strike on Raccoon City, taking her resignation hard as he became Sherry Birkin's legal guardian. He secretly used a sample of her G-Virus-enhanced blood to synthesize the C-Virus, using a variant of it to turn his top scientist Carla Radames into a clone of Ada Wong he later deploys to capture Jake Muller. Simmons then orchestrates the assassination of president Benford in fear that his act of declassifying the Raccoon City incident would jeopardize national security, coercing Helena into infecting the president with the C-virus while causing a viral outbreak in Tall Oaks to cover his tracks with Helena and Leon as his scapegoats. But Simmons was undone by a revenge-driven Carla Radames using the C-Virus, forcing him to travel to China where he gets infected with an Enhanced version of the C-virus and is forsaken by the Family. This results in Simmons being able to mutate into a variety of monstrous forms that include a giant insect-like form from absorbing C-Virus infected zombies, before he was ultimately killed.

Secret Service
Helena Harper
 Voiced by (English): Laura Bailey (RE6)
 Voiced by (Japanese): Mayumi Sako (RE6)
 Facial model by: Natasha Alam
Helena Harper is an agent in the Secret Security Service (USSS) and the personal bodyguard of U.S. President Adam Benford. Harper is a former CIA operative, who receives a second-chance with the USSS after facing two suspensions for using excessive force to defend her family. Derek Simmons blackmails Harper into helping his organization cause a C-virus outbreak in Tall Oaks by kidnapping Helena's sister, Deborah. Benford is infected in the ensuing viral outbreak and becomes a zombie, prompting Kennedy to reluctantly shoot him in the head. Harper and Kennedy work together to locate Deborah before learning Simmons has mutated her into a BOW. Helena is forced to kill her sister, and reveals she worked with Simmons to cause the C-virus outbreak under duress. She eventually confronts and kills Simmons in Lanshiang, China. Harper is cleared of any wrongdoing after the government investigates Simmons’ background.

FBC
The Federal Bioterrorism Commission was a United States government commission set up for handling bioterrorist operations under the command of Lansdale.

Raymond Vester
 Voiced by (English): David Vincent (Revelations)
 Voiced by (Japanese): Yasunori Matsumoto (Revelations)

Raymond Vester was one of the top agents working in the FBC (Federal Bioterrorism Commission). At the time of the 2004 Terragrigia Panic, Raymond was an inexperienced cadet in the FBC. Injured by Veltro's Farfarello, he was rescued by the more experienced agents Parker Luciani and Jessica Sherawat. Retreating back to the conference room where FBC Commissioner Morgan Lansdale was residing, Raymond stumbled upon a telephone conversation Lansdale was having with the Veltro leader, Jack Norman. Raymond became increasingly suspicious of his commanding officer, and knew that he was somehow involved with the bio-terrorist attack. However, he was unable to act on these suspicions, as the city was evacuated and destroyed soon after. At some point after this attack, Raymond became an informant for BSAA leader Clive R. O'Brian, operating as his mole within the FBC. O'Brian and Vester devised a plan to oust Lansdale as the architect of the Terragrigia attack through engineering the "return" of Veltro. Vester would pose as Jack Norman, and O'Brian used a mountain airbase to create the illusion that the terrorist group had resurfaced. In doing so, the two hoped to collect enough evidence to expose Lansdale. During the Queen Zenobia incident, O'Brian let slip that agents Jessica Sherawat and Chris Redfield were captured by Veltro aboard the Zenobia. Intercepting this information, Lansdale sent Vester and his partner Rachael to the ship to determine if the BSAA agents supposedly on board the vessel would pose any threat to him. Vester and O'Brian agreed to push forward the schedule of their plan. After boarding the ship, Vester, with and without his Veltro disguise, encountered Luciani and Valentine on the ship's bridge, making his presence known. Soon after, Agents Sherawat and Redfield boarded the vessel. Just as Raymond was about to reveal Lansdale's secrets to the group, Lansdale's mole, Jessica Sherawat, shot Raymond in the chest, causing him to fall from the balcony. Though Raymond was wearing a bulletproof vest and was unharmed by Jessica's shot, he faked his death while in her presence and whispered critical information about the conspiracy and her true identity. He later resurfaced and helped a gravely injured Luciani escape the sinking ship. Unbeknown to Parker, both Raymond and Jessica were agents of the pharmaceutical division of TRICELL, which had promoted the development of T-Abyss. The two met in a cafe in an unnamed European country, where Vester provided Sherawat with a sample of the T-Abyss.

Strategic Command
Bruce McGivern
 Voiced by (English): Raj Ramayya (Dead Aim)
 Voiced by (Japanese): Hiroaki Hirata (Namco × Capcom)

When a large amount of a recently developed hybrid viral agent known as the "T+G virus" was stolen from the Umbrella Pharmaceuticals Development Center in Paris by a former Umbrella researcher, Bruce McGivern was sent in by the U.S. government to retrieve the virus and neutralize the threat in the Atlantic Ocean on board an Umbrella-owned luxury ocean liner, the Spencer Rain, whose entire personnel on board have been infected with the T-virus stolen by the same former researcher, Morpheus D. Duvall, in September 2002. A member of the USSTRATCOM, McGivern is cocky and brash, and has a tendency to adopt a "shoot first, ask questions later" policy, with little regard for the consequences following his actions. This has often left him in many hostile situations, although in the end, he always somehow comes out on top. Confronted at the very beginning of the game by Duvall, he is saved by Chinese secret agent Fong Ling who throws a grenade at Morpheus (regardless of Bruce's life), seriously wounding the terrorist. He later works with her in order to stop Duvall's plan of unleashing the virus, bringing the fight to an underwater Umbrella secret laboratory which they ultimately destroy as Bruce kills a greatly mutated Duvall. At first at odds with Fong Ling, she and Bruce become closer as the story progresses, particularly after he saves her from an attempt on her life by her own government through the use of satellites armed with lasers. At the end of the game, it is implied that Bruce and Fong will start a relationship.

TerraSave
TerraSave is a non-governmental human rights organization introduced in Resident Evil: Degeneration.

Moira Burton
 Voiced by (English): Marcella Lentz-Pope (Revelations 2)
 Voiced by (Japanese): Ayumi Fujimura (Revelations 2)

Moira Burton (モイラ・バートン Moira Bāton) is the eldest daughter of STARS veteran, Barry Burton. In Resident Evil: Revelations 2, Moira and her TerraSave co-workers including Claire Redfield are captured and taken to an abandoned prison facility supervised by Alex Wesker. Moira is a secondary character in Claire's portion of the game. She refuses to use firearms after accidentally wounding her younger sister with a handgun as a child. Instead, Moira uses tools, such as crowbars, to break open boxes and to attack enemies. She is estranged from her father. Eventually while fighting a mutated Neil Fisher, who betrayed the TerraSave group, Moira overcomes her fear of using guns in order to save Claire if the player selects this option, which is canon. Moira is separated from Claire and saved by Evgeny, a sick Russian man who later chooses death once his daughter is dead. Moira then returns to save her father and friends from Alex Wesker, who is now fully mutated.

Neil Fisher
 Voiced by (English): Yuri Lowenthal
 Voiced by (Japanese): Eiji Hanawa

Neil Fisher is the founding leader of TerraSave, previously an FBC operative who saved Natalia Korda during the Terragrigia incident. But he later revealed to be affiliated with Morgan Lansdale, seeking to revive the FBC following its disbandment when Lansdale's role in the Terragrigia's outbreak is exposed. This motivates Neil to contact Alex Wesker, helping her organize the kidnapping of several TerraSave members for her selection experimentation with her T-Phobos virus in return for a vial of Albert Wesker's Uroboros virus to start his bioterrorist attack. After procuring Natalia for Alex, Neil is betrayed by Alex as she injects him with the Uroboros virus and sends him down to the lower levels of her tower to fight Claire and Moira Burton. The mutated Neil is killed during their fight when Moria, or Claire in the non-canon ending, shoots him in the head at point-blank range.

Neo-Umbrella
Neo-Umbrella is a terrorist organization which serves the primary antagonistic faction of Resident Evil 6. Derek Simmons performs experiments on Carla which ultimately turn her into a clone of Ada Wong. While Carla possesses Ada's physical appearance and mannerisms, she still retains her original psyche. She also harbors a deep resentment towards Simmons, whom she believes stole her research and lifework. Bent on destroying the current world order, Radames personally oversees the bio-terror attacks in Europe, the United States, and China. She exacts revenge on Simmons by having her henchmen infect him with a potent dosage of the C-virus, which turns him into ravenous monster. She is fatally shot by a helicopter sent by the Family, but thanks to injecting herself with an enhanced C-virus, Radames mutated into a formless mass. She is eventually confronted and killed by Ada Wong.

Los Iluminados
Los Iluminados ("the Enlightened") are a religious cult and the main antagonistic faction in Resident Evil 4. The group worship the Plagas parasite buried in an unspecified rural area of Spain in the foot of an unnamed castle. Most members of the cult are infected with the Las Plagas, with key members infected with the dominant variants of the parasite which allow them to retain their sense of self while controlling those who become hosts to the parasites’ recessive variants.

Osmund Saddler
 Voiced by (English): Michael Gough (RE4)
 Voiced by (Japanese): Hōchū Ōtsuka (REmake 4)
 Motion capture: Kenji Hata (RE4)

 is the main antagonist of Resident Evil 4. He is the leader of Los Illuminados, the cult responsible for Ashley Graham's kidnapping. Saddler plans on infecting Graham with a sample of Las Plagas, in hope that she will return home and infect higher-ranking members of the U.S. government. Saddler then attempts to control them and seize control of the country, and then the world. He uses samples of Las Plagas to infect and control villagers and even a local castellan Ramon Salazar (ラモン・サラザール) to perform his bidding. However, his plans are foiled by the combined efforts of Kennedy, Wong and Luis Sera. Kennedy, with the assistance of Wong, kills Saddler near the game's conclusion, and destroys his research and production complex.

Ramon Salazar
 Voiced by (English): Rene Mujica (voice actor) (RE4)
 Voiced by (Japanese): Chō (REmake 4)
 Motion capture: Tsurugi-Dan (RE4)

Ramon Salazar is a secondary antagonist in Resident Evil 4. He is the castellan of the castle affiliated with Los Iluminados. He comes from a noble family, who were responsible for sealing Las Plagas beneath the castle's grounds. Years later, Saddler, a cultist who worships Las Plagas, persuaded Salazar to unearth the parasites, causing them to spread across the local area. Salazar controls the Ganados and orders them to kill Kennedy and apprehend Ashley Graham. He merges with his second Verdugo in a Queen Plaga to become a gigantic abomination in a desperate attempt to defeat Kennedy, but perishes during the ensuing fight.

Bitores Mendez
 Voiced by: Jesse Corti (voice actor) (RE4)
 Motion capture: Kenji Hata (RE4)

Bitorez Mendez is the chief of the unnamed Spanish village, taken over by Osmund Saddler and the Los Illuminados cult. He is given a Dominant Species of the Plaga Parasite, allowing him to command others infected with Las Plagas and granting him incredible strength. Mendez is confronted numerous times throughout the first two chapters of Resident Evil 4 by Leon Kennedy, during the latter's attempt to save the President's daughter from the village. In their last confrontation in a barn, Mendez is forced to mutate after being doused in gasoline and set on fire, eventually detaching the lower part of his body and using the rafters to traverse and attack Leon. He is finally killed by the agent and his glass eye is used to access Salazar's castle. Resident Evil Archives II states that Mendez used to be a Catholic priest before being converted to the Los Illuminados cult.

TRICELL
TRICELL Inc. is a multi-industrial conglomerate descended from Travis Enterprises, names for the three organizations that formed it and  prominent in the Federation of Pharmaceutical Companies. Due to Umbrella's actions in the first three games, TRICELL disassociates from the company while playing a role in the establishment of the BSAA. But TRICELL became an antagonistic element in Resident Evil Revelations and Resident Evil 5 in creating the T-Abyss and Uroboros viruses while forming a partnership with Albert Wesker before he betrayed them when the company later dissolved after being exposed.

 Jessica Sherawat 
 Voiced by: Nana Mizuki

Jessica Sherawat is an operative of TRICELL who appeared in Resident Evil Revelations, first infiltrated the FBC during the Terragrigia Panic, and later transferred to the BSAA a year later during their investigation of Il Veltro terrorists to acquire a sample of the T-Abyss TRICELL made for Morgan Lansdale. She ultimately succeeds with the assistance of Raymond Vester keeping both groups unaware of their actual goals.

Jack Krauser
 Voiced by (English): Jim Ward (RE4, TDC, Mercenaries 3D)
 Voiced by (Japanese): Kengo Tsujii (REmake 4)
 Motion capture: Ryouji Okamoto (RE4, in-game), Munenori Yuo (RE4, cutscenes)

 is a freelance mercenary hired by Albert Wesker to infiltrate Saddler's cult. Originally a U.S. government special forces operative, he was partnered with Leon to arrest the South American drug lord Javier Hidalgo. They discover the village suffering a T-Virus outbreak while encountering Manuela Hidalgo who was injected with the T-Veronica virus,  Krauser learning of Wesker and the Umbrella conspiracy from Leon. Discharged from the military after his arm severely injured from fighting Hidalgo, Krauser seeks out Wesker to recover from his injury and become stronger. He later supposedly perished in a helicopter crash. Krauser is responsible for kidnapping Ashley, claiming he committed the act to gain Saddler's trust. He has little interest in Saddler's agenda, and only seeks to recover a Las Plagas sample for Wesker for the latter's plan to restore the then-defunct Umbrella Corporation, believing such would bring order and balance to the world. In addition to being a skilled knife fighter and archer, Krauser possesses superhuman speed, stamina, strength, the dominant variant of Las Plagas injected into his body can turn his left arm into a giant mutated claw. He confronts Kennedy twice in the game's main storyline and is defeated by him, later killed by Ada in the "Separate Ways" scenario. It would be later revealed that Wesker retrieve Krauser's corpse and extracted his Las Plagas after Ada gave him a recessive variant. Krauser is playable in Mercenaries mode. He uses his bow in combat and can also utilize his mutated arm as a melee weapon.

 Excella Gionne 
 Voiced and motion capture performance by Nina Fehren

Excella Gionne is a British-Italian businesswoman who oversees TRICELL's Bio-Weapons program while also being the leader of the conglomerate's African branch, establishing a massive bio-weapons research facility in the Kijuju Autonomous Zone within a former Umbrella facility while regrouping a bio weapons dealer named Ricardo Irving to provide her with funding for the Uroboros Project she developed with Wesker. However, despite her love and loyalty to Wesker, he infects her with the Uroboros in an act of betrayal. With her body unable to stabilize the virus, she mutates into Uroboros Aheri while absorbing a pile of corpses to increase in size before Chris and Sheva manage to kill the creature.

Four Houses
The Four Houses are the main antagonistic faction in Resident Evil Village. The governing body of the titular location, the leaders are each infected with the local "mold" pathogen, known as "Cadou", and answer only to Mother Miranda. Though each house has their own sigil, their shared icon inspired the Umbrella Corporation's logo. Each of the Four Houses members are based on classic gothic horror characters and creatures, including vampires, ghosts, werewolves, witches, warlocks, ghouls, and Victor Frankenstein. Their presence had inspired a storybook titled the "Village of Shadows".

Mother Miranda
Voiced by (English) and motion capture performance: Michelle Lukes
Voiced by (Japanese): Sayaka Kinoshita

Mother Miranda is the main antagonist of Resident Evil Village, a scientist who was born in an Eastern European village in the late 19th century and lost her daughter Eva during the Spanish flu pandemic. While entering a cave with the intent of following her daughter in death, a despondent Miranda is infected while coming across a fungal superorganism called the "Megamycete" within the cave that granted her immortality, the ability to assume the form of others, and the collective knowledge of those the fungus came in contact with prior. Miranda uses her gained abilities to experiment on the villagers for years, creating the Cadou parasites in failed attempts to create an ideal vessel to revive Eva in. Miranda is later revealed to be the mentor of Umbrella Corporation founder Oswell E. Spencer and inspired him to achieve his vision of human evolution, making Miranda the indirect instigator of all the major events that transpire in the series. She also provided her assistance to the Connections by providing them the means to create Eveline, later learning of Rosemary Winters from them as she abducts the infant so she can resurrect her daughter. She is ultimately killed by Ethan who rescues Rosemary from her before sacrificing himself to destroy the Megamycete. Miranda also appears in the game's Shadows of Rose DLC, where it's revealed her consciousness survived in the Megamycete's realm. During the events, she lures Rose into the realm to resume her plans, tricking her into depowering for her success. However, Ethan, having also survived in the realm, helps Rose escape and battle Miranda, resulting in her permanent death. She is based on witches.

Alcina Dimitrescu

Alcina Dimitrescu is the matriarch of House Dimitrescu. She serves as one of the four lords of the village and the owner of Castle Dimitrescu. Both she and her daughters are based on vampires.

Dimitrescu Daughters
Voiced by (English) and motion capture performance: Bekka Prewitt (Bela), Jeanette Maus (Cassandra), Nicole Tompkins (Daniela)

The Daughters of Alcina Dimitrescu are three women "adopted" by the lady and reside in Castle Dimitrescu. The trio are three human/blowfly hybrids created by their "mother" through experiments with the Cadou, granting them similar abilities to her. However, their nature renders them vulnerable to harm in colder temperatures. Bela is calm, level-headed and rather calculative. Cassandra is more reckless and sadistic of the trio, delighting in torture and painful deaths for her victims. Daniella is the quieter, but most seductive of the group. The daughters each fight Ethan Winters as he searches the castle for his daughter Rose, each confronting him alone in certain areas of the castle. They are each killed when he exploits their weakness to make them vulnerable to his attacks. The daughters are heavily influenced by vampires, specifically the Brides of Dracula.

Donna Beneviento
Voiced by (English): Andi Norris (Donna), Paula Rhodes (Angie)
Motion Capture: Andi Norris (As Donna herself)
Voiced by (Japanese): Miyuki Sato

Donna Beneviento is the matriarch of House Beneviento and one of the four Lords of the Village. Horribly disfigured since birth, Donna went into solitude after the death of her parents, residing in a lone estate north of the village. Through the Cadou experiments conducted on her by Mother Miranda, Donna is granted the ability to manipulate her dolls as extensions of herself and induce hallucinations through Cadou-infected pollen. She is rarely seen without her bride doll Angie, whom she usually speaks through. Entrusted with Rose's legs, Donna is the second of the Village Lords fought by Ethan, subjecting him to nightmarish hallucinations before he escapes and stabs her to death. She is based on Ghosts due to her "possession" of dolls and having a well in her home, referencing The Ring.

Salvatore Moreau
Voiced by (English) and motion capture performance: Jesse Pimentel
Voiced by (Japanese): Taisuke Nishimura

Salvatore Moreau is the patriarch of House Moreau and one of the Four Lords in Resident Evil Village. Taking residence in the windmills near the reservoir, he is granted aquatic abilities by Miranda's Cadou yet is hideously mutated with his body slightly unstable. Moreau is the least respected of the lords despite his utmost devotion towards Miranda. Ethan encounters him to recover Rose's arms, but Salvatore traps him within the reservoir's area and patrols the area in his more monstrous form. Ethan drains the site to battle Salvatore on the dried-up bed, during which he is killed. Though not based on gothic-horror, he might be based on the Gill-man from the Creature from the Black Lagoon, his last name is also a reference to the 1896 novel, The Island of Doctor Moreau due to him creating the Lycans just like the titular character created Human–animal hybrids.

Karl Heisenberg
Voiced by (English) and motion capture performance: Neil Newbon
Voiced by (Japanese): Hiroshi Shirokuma

Karl Heisenberg is one of the four lords of Resident Evil Village and the owner of a factory located west of the Village. Through experiments conducted on him with the Cadou, he is granted superhuman strength along with harnessing electromagnetism from the electric organs connected to his nervous system. Unlike the other lords, Heisenberg is more rebellious and actively plots to overthrow Miranda for experimenting on him. He is the last of the village lords Ethan faces, though he initially hands over Rose's torso willingly to help Ethan access his factory. Claiming Miranda has been using him to eliminate the other Lords, Heisenberg proposes an alliance with Ethan to use his daughter to kill her. When he refuses, Heisenberg locks him into his factory to be killed by Soldat experiments. With help from Chris Redfield, Ethan battles a heavily cyber-mutated Heisenberg and kills him in a metal-polymer tank. He is based on Dr. Frankenstein.

Other characters
Alan Droney
 Voiced by (English): Kip Pardue (RE7)
 Voiced by (Japanese): Kiyomitsu Mizuuchi (RE7)
 Face model: Mark Hobart

Alan Droney is an agent for the Connections. He and Mia Winters were tasked with transporting the Bio Organic Weapon Eveline. Eventually, Eveline infects the people on board, including Alan, turning most into mold. When he began to show symptoms of infection, he dispatched Mia to kill or recapture her. Shortly afterwards, Alan is killed by Eveline.

Ark Thompson
 Voiced by: Patrick Harlan (Resident Evil Survivor)

Ark Thompson is a friend of Leon S. Kennedy who was sent by him to Sheena Island to investigate the Umbrella's facilities there, where the company has its private township, soon after the Raccoon City incident in 1998. He ends up posing as Vincent Goldman, an Umbrella manager, but loses his memory after a helicopter crash. During the game, he is led to believe that he is Vincent Goldman and is mistakenly blamed for the T-virus outbreak on the island. As he investigates, he progressively gets his memories back and confronts the real Vincent Goldman. He eventually escapes the facility before its destruction aboard a helicopter along with Lott and Lily Klein, two children of Umbrella scientists whose parents died in the incident.

Ashley Graham

 Voiced by (English): Carolyn Lawrence (RE4)
 Voiced by (Japanese): Akari Kitō (REmake 4)
 Motion capture: Yukiko Saitani (RE4), Ella Freya (REmake 4)

 is the new U.S. President's daughter in Resident Evil 4. A college student living in Massachusetts, Ashley is abducted by a mysterious cult while attempting to return to her home. She is taken to a remote part of Spain and held captive in a village inhabited by humans infected with mind-controlling parasites. The cult's leader, Osmund Saddler, plans to infect her with Las Plagas, to carry out the cult's secret agenda. She is rescued by Kennedy, and works alongside him to thwart the cult's plans and escape. In addition to being able to receive commands and perform simple tasks, Ashley briefly becomes a playable character for a portion of the game.

Baker family

The Baker family, under the influence of the B.O.W. Eveline, are the main antagonists of Resident Evil 7: Biohazard. Unlike the rest of her family, Zoe Baker is a supporting character who provides assistance to the main character Ethan Winters. A member of the extended family, Joe Baker, is the player character of its post-launch DLC End of Zoe.

Ben Bertolucci
 Voiced by (English): Rod Wilson (RE2), Skip Stellrecht (The Darkside Chronicles)
 Voiced by (Japanese): Atsushi Imaruoka (REmake 2)
Played by: Josh Cruddas (Welcome to Raccoon City)

 is a minor character in Resident Evil 2. A journalist, he investigates Chief Brian Irons and Umbrella during their attempts to cover up the Mansion Incident. Eventually discovering evidence linking him to Umbrella, he is arrested and held in the RPD holding cells. In the original game, Ben is approached by Leon S. Kennedy and Ada Wong on information he has uncovered on Umbrella and helps them escape the building. However, he is killed by William Birkin before he can be released from his cell. Before dying, he gives Leon evidence linking Irons to a coverup of the G-virus. In the game's remake, Ben's role is significantly reduced to a brief meeting with Leon. He offers his parking pass to escape the building in exchange for his release, but is killed by the Tyrant before Leon can decide. Opening his cell, Leon retrieves both the pass and a recording of him confronting Annette Birkin on Umbrella's actions and the creation of the G-virus. Ben also appears in The Darkside Chronicles, though he is killed off-screen by Birkin before he can meet Leon, Claire or Ada.

In the reboot film Resident Evil: Welcome to Raccoon City (2021), Ben is played by Josh Cruddas.

Clancy Javis
Voiced by (English): Tony Vogel (RE7)
Voiced by (Japanese): Yu Seki (RE7)
Clancy Javis is a playable character from Resident Evil 7: The Beginning Hour. He enters the Bakers' residence with Andre Stickland and Peter Walken to film an episode of Sewer Gators. He is briefly a playable character while filming Peter. Clancy then searches for Andre who wanders away from the group but is knocked unconscious after discovering Andre's corpse. Later, Clancy was tied up and taken into a game room by Lucas who dares him to solve various puzzles in order to light the candle and put it on the cake. When Clancy removed the turner from the barrel, the oil leaks out. After various puzzles, he lights a birthday cake which suddenly exploded, causing him to be engulfed in flames, killing him in the process.

Clancy also appears in the Banned Footage DLC for the game, a collection of stories that take place before the events of the game. In "Nightmare", Clancy is forced to contend with seemingly endless waves of Molded throughout a night, eventually facing Jack in combat. In "Bedroom", he tries to escape the master bedroom of the house whilst being monitored by Marguerite. In "21", Clancy is forced to play a card game against another victim of the Bakers, Hoffman, by Lucas, eventually beating him and leading to Hoffman's death. His success leads to Lucas placing him in the Happy Birthday death trap.

Daniel Cortini
Daniel Cortini is a minor character in the Resident Evil 2 remake. The sheriff of Arklay county, he takes part holding back the T-virus outbreak in the Raccoon City area. Whilst investigating a gas station near the city, Daniel is killed by a zombie after being distracted by the arrival of either Leon or Claire. He appears as a playable protagonist in The Ghost Survivors DLC chapter "No Way Out", which is unlockable after completing the other chapters. A non-canonical account, Daniel battles a large number of enemies in a gas station until he can be rescued.

Deborah Harper
 Voiced by (English): Kate Higgins (RE6)
 Motion capture: Lauren Kim (RE6)

Deborah Harper is the younger sister of Helena Harper. In the past, Helena was known to be very protective towards Deborah, having wounded Deborah's abusive ex-boyfriend. In Resident Evil 6, the two sisters were held as hostages by Derek C. Simmons in the secret lab underneath the Tall Oaks Cathedral. Helena tried her best to keep a terrified Deborah calm and assures her. Helena offered herself to Simmons in exchange for her sister, but her pleas did nothing and Deborah was dragged away. Deborah was later taken to the catacombs of the cathedral, and was injected with C-virus; however, as she showed no signs of mutation, Deborah was left to die. After Helena and Leon rescue Deborah, they soon arrive at the lower levels of the catacombs, where Deborah becomes very ill before bursting into flames; a goo then hardens into a cocoon around her. As the lower levels then begin to crumble, Deborah emerges with spider-like appendages on her back. Despite Helena's pleas not to harm her sister, Ada reminds her that Deborah has to be killed or else they will die. After the battle, Helena grabs Deborah as she slips and falls over a pit. She then begs for forgiveness, saying she will avenge her sister after she and Leon kill Simmons, and releases Deborah as she falls to her death into the darkness below. At the end of Leon and Helena's campaign, Helena visits Deborah's grave at a cemetery.

Evgeny Rebic
Voiced by: Ben Hiura (Revelations 2)

Rebic is an old Russian man Claire and Moira meet on the island they are trapped on in Resident Evil: Revelations 2. He is a miner who is not happy that they are potentially alerting the afflicted to his hideout; Moira ends up doing this by mistake while later spending time with him after her near death experience that resulted in her being away from Claire for 6 months. Although Evgeny is just a bit part character in the main game, he is the co-op partner of Moira in "The Struggle" bonus episode, and uses a rifle to shoot wild animals (for food) and kill enemies. He rescued Moira beneath all the debris that fell on her, but does not call her by that name afterwards, and he teaches her to hunt for herself, while they are putting up with one another's whining. He later learns his missing daughter named Irina is already dead and feeling unwell, Evgeny chooses to die in the underground, with Evgeny and Moira revealing their names to each other just before he passes. His body is eventually found by Barry and Natalia.

Fong Ling
 Voiced by (English): Claire O'Connor (Dead Aim)
 Voiced by (Japanese): Kae Araki (Namco × Capcom)

A Chinese intelligence agent employed by the Ministry of State Security (MSS) of the People's Republic of China, Fong is infamous for her cold and stoic demeanor. Upon learning of her brother's involvement in anti-government activism, Fong arrested him. Following his arrest, Fong's brother was swiftly executed, although she never questioned the actions of her boss and remained absolutely loyal, stopping at nothing to accomplish her objectives. She is sent by the Chinese government to the Umbrella-owned luxury liner Spencer Rain to stop former Umbrella scientist Morpheus Duvall's plans and retrieve the sample of the virus he stole from an Umbrella's lab in Paris. Initially apathetic towards the presence of a rival operative, Bruce McGivern, going so far as to throw a grenade at Duvall who was holding him at gunpoint, she allies with him in order to stop Duvall. At some point, the Chinese government betrays her and attempts to kill her through the use of satellites armed with lasers, but Bruce saves her. Though greatly shaken by this event, she decides to complete her mission and to keep working for her employers afterward. And from that moment on, she becomes closer to Bruce. After killing Duvall and destroying an Umbrella secret laboratory underwater, it is implied that Bruce and Fong will start a relationship.

Katherine Warren
Katherine Warren is the daughter of Raccoon City's Mayor, Michael Warren. Left behind in Raccoon City by her father, she is left in the care of Chief Brian Irons. Driven insane by the outbreak, Irons instead murders Katherine, planning to stuff her body and keep it as part of his taxidermy collection. Warren's body appears in both versions of Resident Evil 2 and its retelling The Darkside Chronicles. She appears in the remake's Ghost Survivors DLC story "Runaway", which takes place outside of the main series canon.

Lisa Trevor
 Played by: Marina Mazepa (Welcome to Raccoon City), Casey B. Dolan (Netflix's Resident Evil)
 is a character and enemy in the remake of Resident Evil and The Umbrella Chronicles. Lisa Trevor is the daughter of George Trevor, the architect behind Ozwell Spencer's Arklay Mansion and the Queen Zenobia cruiser, and his wife Jessica. Following the completion of the mansion's construction, Spencer invites the family to stay there, but betrays George by kidnapping Jessica and Lisa and uses them as human test subjects for genetic experimentation. George is also forced to try to escape the mansion, eventually getting lost and dying of malnutrition. Lisa undergoes a series of painful experiments, including receiving the Progenitor virus, while her mother is secretly murdered. Lisa emerges with a grotesque and twisted physical appearance, but gains enhanced strength and nigh-invincibility. Further experimentation on Lisa allows Umbrella's top scientists, William Birkin and Albert Wesker, to develop the G-virus. Lisa is then executed and buried, but she survives and hides in the Arklay forest. She encounters STARS operatives during the events of Resident Evil before ultimately finding her mother's corpse, granting her some closure. Lisa makes her final appearance in The Umbrella Chronicles, where she is defeated by Wesker and left to die as the Arklay mansion and research facility self-destruct.

In 2012, IGN ranked as the ninth best boss in the series, adding, "Not only can her wails be heard throughout the game, she effectively can't be killed – only deterred. Few things are scarier than that, making her one of the more memorable and entrenched characters in the series."

In the reboot film Resident Evil: Welcome to Raccoon City (2021), Trevor is played by Marina Mazepa. Trevor also appeared in the fifth episode of the Netflix television series (2022), played by Casey B. Dolan.

Luis Sera
 Voiced by (English): Rino Romano (RE4)
 Voiced by (Japanese): Kenjiro Tsua (REmake 4)
 Motion capture: Keiichi Wada (RE4)

 is a Spanish investigator, who tries to assist Kennedy and Ada Wong in their efforts against Los Illuminados. He is extremely familiar with the village where the game is set and formerly worked with Osmund Saddler to research and develop the cult's mind-controlling parasites. After realizing Saddler intends to use the parasites for malicious purposes, he attempts to sabotage the cult's mission. Sera meets Kennedy after both of the men are captured by villagers. He introduces himself as a former policeman from Madrid, who became dissatisfied with his job. It is later revealed in the game that Sera was one of the top researchers in finding Las Plagas. He considered the resulting outbreak to be his fault and attempted to eliminate it, aiding Leon. He is ultimately killed by Saddler before he can present him with a sample of Las Plagas.

Mia Winters
 Voiced by (English) and motion capture performance: Katie O'Hagan
 Voiced by (Japanese): Akari Higuchi
 Face model: Savannah Daniels

Mia is the spouse of Ethan Winters, the main character in Resident Evil 7: Biohazard. A researcher for a criminal organization called The Connections, Mia was tasked with escorting a bio-weapon called Eveline to another facility. But the tanker crashes in a Louisianan swamp during a hurricane, with Mia infected by Eveline as they end up with the Baker family. As the result of her infection, Mia lashes out at Ethan when he came looking for her. From that point on, Mia works with a woman called Zoe (who is revealed to be a Baker) and Ethan tries to save them by receiving hints from Zoe when she telephones him, while Ethan is having to deal with constant attacks perpetrated by the other Bakers. After using one of the two serums Zoe created to kill Jack Baker, Ethan used the remaining vial on Mia as they are forced to leave Zoe behind. The two end up at the remains of the tanker, Mia regaining her memories while resisting Eveline to give Ethan samples from Eveline to develop a toxin to kill her with. She is reunited with Ethan after being rescued by BSAA agents, later giving birth to Rosemary while not telling Ethan the truth that he was infected with the Mold as they moved to Eastern Europe.

In the events of Resident Evil Village, Mia is abducted by her former colleague Miranda, who assumed her identity to steal Rose as a vessel for her lost child Eva. Mia ends up being rescued by Chris and revealing Ethan's altered nature when told that Jack Baker killed him. After Ethan permanently died destroying the megamycete, Mia raised Rosemary while Chris would later train the girl in using her abilities.

Natalia Korda
 Voiced by (English): Gabriella Pastore (Revelations 2)
 Voiced by (Japanese): Aoi Yūki (Revelations 2)
A young girl who is a playable character in Resident Evil: Revelations 2, a survivor of the Terragrigia panic who lost her parents in the incident while saved by Neil Fisher and placed in a home before she was among those he abducts for Alex Wesker's selection experiment to transfer a copy of her mind into an ideal host able to suppress their fear. Natalia traveled with Claire and Moira before Neil spirits her away when Alex decides to make the girl her host, placing her in a deep sleep for the process before committing suicide.

Awakening six months later, with the copy of Alex's mind appearing before her as Dark Natalia while looking for her teddy bear Lottie, Natalia meets Barry Burton immediately when he arrives on an island to search for Moira. Natalia aids Barry by detecting monsters, go through small passageways, and using bricks as projectiles when not evading monsters. But Natalia is stalked by Alex, who mutated and survived her suicide with a maddened resolve to kill the girl before she fully awakens as her copy. Barry adopts Natalia following the ordeal, with the copy of Alex's mind appearing to be taking over as Natalia reads a piece by Franz Kafka while smiling.

Robert Kendo
Voiced by (English): Gary Krawford (RE2), Jason C. Miller (DC), Ken Lally (REmake 2, REmake 3)
Motion Capture Performance by: Ken Lally (REmake 2 ), Neil Newbon (REmake 3)
Voiced by (Japanese): Hideki Tanaka (REmake 2, REmake 3)

Robert Kendo is the owner of a gun store in Raccoon City. He and his brother Joseph are responsible for creating the Samurai Edge pistols used by S.T.A.R.S. members.  In the original Resident Evil 2, he briefly appears in the opening of Scenario A, allowing the player to stay in his gunshop for protection. However, zombies soon break in and devour Kendo, leaving a weapon for the player to pick up. In the remake, Robert confronts Leon S. Kennedy and Ada Wong as they attempt to pass through the shop to reach the sewers. It's also revealed he has a daughter, Emma, who he tries to protect from the outbreak. However, she is infected and Robert is forced to kill her. Kendo also appears in the game's The Ghost Survivors DLC as the player character in "No Time to Mourn". A non-canonical scenario, it follows him as he attempts to escape Raccoon City. He also appears in The Darkside Chronicles, though is killed offscreen before he encounters either Leon or Claire.

Steve Burnside
 Voiced by: Bill Houston (Code: Veronica), Sam Riegel (The Darkside Chronicles)

 is Claire Redfield's partner in the game Resident Evil – Code: Veronica. Steve was imprisoned in the Rockfort Island's facility alongside his father, a former Umbrella employee. He escapes from his cell during the viral outbreak. Steve was initially hesitant to trust Claire while reluctantly cooperating with her, but gradually cares for her after being forced to kill his own father when he becomes infected. Steve and Claire eventually end up in Umbrella's Antarctic Facility, where he is captured by Alexia and infected with the T-Veronica virus to be compelled to kill Claire. Though he mutated into a nearly invulnerable monster armed with  a giant, ceremonial axe, Steve eventually regained control of himself and is fatally injured protecting Claire from Alexia's tentacles and reverts while professing his love to Claire in his final moments. Steve's body was later taken by Wesker to extract the T-Veronica virus. In The Darkside Chronicles it is revealed that Wesker contacted the drug baron Javier Hidalgo and took a sample of T-Veronica from Steve's corpse in order to sell the virus for Hidalgo's ailing daughter, Manuela.

The Duke
 Voiced by (English): Aaron LaPlante
The Duke is a merchant and vendor in Resident Evil Village. An obese and mysterious figure, he sells items, weapons and upgrades to the player. The Duke also buys treasures and items, and will cook meals in return for the needed ingredients. The Duke helps Ethan traverse the titular village and helps him recover Rose's body parts from the Four Lords. After Ethan is mortally injured by Miranda, the Duke recovers his body and takes him to the ritual site to confront her. Like the Merchant from Resident Evil 4, the Duke's past and history remains mysterious, though files indicate that he sells objects and provisions to the entire village, including forbidden items. The Duke also appears to relocate without being detected and set up shop within three of the Four Lords' territory (except House Beneviento because Ethan's weapons had been taken). When Ethan returns to the ceremonial site after killing Donna and Moreau, he can be seen observing a Miss Madalina doll and a jar of a Cadou Parasite. A corrupted version of the Duke, referred to as the "Masked Duke", appears in the game's DLC chapter Shadows of Rose. Files in the game reveal this version to be a construct of the Megamycete created by Mother Miranda. The Masked Duke serves as an enemy to Rose Winters as she searches for a crystal to remove her powers at a recreation of Castle Dimitrescu. 

The Merchant
 Voiced by (English): Paul Mercier (RE4)
 Voiced by (Japanese): Shigeru Chiba (REmake 4)

The Merchant is a mysterious hooded vendor in Resident Evil 4''. Appearing in certain areas of the games locations, he sells to the player character in return for Peseta. The Merchant can also sell upgrades, including those to weapons and storage capacity, and buy treasures and items. While playing as Leon, the Merchant will set the player a number of optional quests, such as a shooting range or destruction of blue medallions around the village. According to the Duke, the Merchant is a friend of his.

Characters created for the film series

Citations

General and cited references 
 
 

 
Resident Evil